Earl of Sandwich is a restaurant franchise based in Orlando, Florida, United States.  It was founded by the 11th Earl of Sandwich, his younger son Hon. Orlando Montagu, and businessman Robert Earl, founder of Planet Hollywood.

History
Earl of Sandwich is the brainchild of Orlando Montagu, the younger son of the 11th Earl of Sandwich.  He and his father are direct descendants of the 4th Earl who popularised the sandwich in Great Britain and Ireland in the 18th century.

The first restaurant was opened on March 19, 2004, located in Downtown Disney (now known as Disney Springs) on the property of the Walt Disney World Resort outside of Orlando, Florida. Earl of Sandwich has franchising plans in the United States and the United Kingdom, including the Planet Hollywood Resort and Casino in Las Vegas, Nevada.

The first Earl of Sandwich franchise opened in Sugar Land, Texas, and is owned by an investment group which includes Nolan Ryan and Roger Clemens. Additional locations have opened since, in various states across the U.S.

The first Earl of Sandwich restaurant outside of the United States opened on April 18, 2011, in London, but closed on February 28, 2014. The chain has since expanded to the Disney Village at Disneyland Paris, in addition to locations in Kelowna, Calgary, Edmonton, and Winnipeg in Canada and five in the Philippines.

References

External links

 

Submarine sandwich restaurants
Fast-food chains of the United States
Restaurants established in 2004
Companies based in Orlando, Florida
2004 establishments in Florida
American companies established in 2004